Mykolaivka is one of the most common toponyms (place names) in Ukraine. The name is diminutive derivative of Mykolaiv.

City
 Mykolaivka, Donetsk Oblast, a city in Donetsk Oblast

Urban-type settlements
 Mykolaivka, Simferopol Raion, an urban-type settlement in Simferopol Raion, Crimea
 Mykolaivka, Obukhivka settlement hromada, Dnipro Raion, Dnipropetrovsk Oblast, an urban-type settlement in Dnipro Raion, Dnipropetrovsk Oblast
 Mykolaivka, Karpivka rural hromada, Kryvyi Rih Raion, Dnipropetrovsk Oblast, a rural locality in Kryvyi Rih Raion, Dnipropetrovsk Oblast
 Mykolaivka, Khartsyzk, an administrative division of Donetsk Oblast
 Mykolaivka, Odessa Oblast, an urban-type settlement in Odessa Oblast, formerly Mykolaivka Druha
 Mykolaivka, Sumy Raion, Sumy Oblast, an urban-type settlement in Sumy Oblast, formerly Zhovtneve

Villages
Mykolayivka, Stanytsia-Luhanska Raion, Luhansk Oblast
Mykolaivka, Kharkiv Raion, Kharkiv Oblast, a village in Kharkiv Oblast, formerly Melyhivka
Mykolaivka, Berislavskyi Raion, Kherson Oblast, a village in Kherson Oblast, on the north bank of the Dnipro river
Mykolaivka, Hornostaivskyi Raion, Kherson Oblast, a village in Kherson Oblast, 15km east of the Dnipro river
Mykolaikva, Mykolaiv Oblast, a village in Mykolaiv Oblast

Combined derivatives 

 Mykolaivka Druha, Odessa Oblast

 Stara Mykolaivka, Kostiantynivka Raion, a Ukrainian toponym

See also
 Mykolaiv (disambiguation)